This is a list of buildings in Cairo, Egypt.

Ancient sites and monuments 

 Giza Pyramids
 Senusret I Obelisk (Heliopolis Obelisk)

Museums

Egyptian Museum
Coptic Museum
 Grand Egyptian Museum (under construction)
 Museum of Islamic Art
 Museum of Islamic Ceramics
 Gayer-Anderson Museum
 Mostafa Kamel Museum

Religious buildings

Muslim

Abu al-'Ila Mosque
Al-Azhar Mosque
Al-Hakim Mosque
Al-Hussein Mosque
Al-Rifa'i Mosque
Aqmar Mosque
Aqsunqur Mosque (Blue Mosque)
Demerdash Mosque
Ibn Tulun Mosque
Juyushi Mosque
Khanqah of Baybars II
Khanqah of Faraj ibn Barquq
Khanqah-Mausoleum of Sultan al-Ashraf Barsbay
Lulua Mosque
Madrasa of Umm al-Sultan Sha'ban
Madrasa of Amir Sunqur Sa'di (Mausoleum of Hasan Sadaqa, Mawlawiyya Museum)
Mashhad of Sayyida Ruqayya
Mausoleum of Imam al-Shafi'i
Mausoleum of Tarabay al-Sharifi
Mosque of Amir al-Sayf Sarghatmish
Mosque and Khanqah of Shaykhu
Mosque and Mausoleum of Sultan Qaytbay
Mosque and Mausoleum of Amir Khayrbak
Mosque of Abu Dahab
Mosque of al-Burdayni
Mosque of al-Nasir Muhammad
Mosque of al-Salih Tala'i
Mosque of al-Zahir Baybars
Mosque of Amir al-Maridani
Mosque of Amr ibn al-As
Mosque of Khushqadam El-Ahmadi
Mosque of Muhammad Ali
Mosque of Qani-Bay
Mosque of Qanibay al-Muhammadi
Mosque of Qijmas al-Ishaqi
Mosque of Sultan al-Muayyad
Mosque of Taghribirdi
Mosque-Madrasa of Sultan al-Ashraf Barsbay
Mosque-Madrasa of Sultan Barquq
Mosque-Madrasa of Sultan Hassan
Qarafa Mosque
Qubbat Afandina
Rabaa Al-Adawiya Mosque
Sayida Aisha Mosque
Sayida Nafisa Mosque
Sayida Zaynab Mosque
Sultaniyya Mausoleum
Tomb of Salar and Sangar-al-Gawli
Christian
All Saints' Cathedral (Anglican / Episcopal)
Basilica of St Therese of the Child Jesus (Roman Catholic)
Cathedral of Our Lady of Fatima (Chaldean Catholic)
Church of St George (Greek Orthodox)
Church of the Virgin Mary (Haret Zuweila)
Maadi Community Church
Saint Mark's Coptic Orthodox Cathedral
Saint Mary Church (Haret Elroum)
St Andrew's United Church
The Hanging Church

Palaces, historic mansions, and villas in Cairo 

Abdeen Palace
Al-Gawhara Palace
Amir Alin Aq Palace
Amir Taz Palace
Baron Empain Palace
 Bayt al-Kritliyya (Gayer-Anderson Museum)
 Bayt Al-Razzaz palace
 Bayt al-Sinnari
 Bayt Al-Suhaymi
Beshtak Palace
Dubara Palace
Gezirah Palace
Heliopolis Palace
Khairy Pasha Palace
Koubbeh Palace
Manial Palace and Museum
Manasterly Palace
Palace of Yashbak
Prince Amr Ibrahim Palace
Tahra Palace
Tara
Zaafarana palace

Historic fortresses and gates 

 Babylon Fortress
Cairo Citadel (Citadel of Saladin)
 Bab al-Barqiyya
 Bab al-Futuh
Bab al-Nasr
Bab Zuweila

Historic commercial and civic buildings 

 Cairo Citadel Aqueduct
 Maristan of al-Mu'ayyad
 Maristan of Qalawun (part of Sultan Qalawun's complex)
 Sabil-Kuttab of Katkhuda
 Wikala and Sabil-Kuttab of Sultan Qaytbay
Wikala of Sultan Al-Ghuri
 Wikala of Sultan Qaytbay

Other buildings

 Belmont Building
 Cairo International Stadium
 Cairo Opera House
 Cairo Tower
 Headquarters of the Arab League
 The Mogamma
 Ramses Exchange
 Yacoubian Building
 Immobilia Building

See also
 List of tallest buildings in Cairo
 Residential Architecture in Historic Cairo

References

External links
 

 
Cairo
Cairo-related lists